Ram Sewak Chowdhary was an Indian politician. He was a Member of Parliament , representing Uttar Pradesh in the Rajya Sabha the upper house of India's Parliament representing the Indian National Congress.

References

External links
 Official Biographical Sketch in Indian Parliament Website

Rajya Sabha members from Uttar Pradesh
Indian National Congress politicians
1927 births
Possibly living people